Peoria Babylon is a 1997 comedy-genre film directed by Steven Diller. It premiered at the Chicago Lesbian and Gay International Film Festival in November 1997.

Plot 
Candy and her gay friend Jon are owners of a financially troubled art gallery in Peoria, Illinois. After exhausting their savings, they concoct a devious scheme in order to save the gallery in this screwball comedy.

They team up with a hunky con artist, the mob and a lesbian porn queen, but at the end little is left standing but their friendship.

Cast 
 David Drake as Jon Ashe
 Ann Cusack as Candy Dineen
 Matthew Pestorius as Matthew Perretti
 Paul Adelstein as Brad Kessler
 The Lady Bunny as Octavia DiMare
 Marilyn Pittman as Doris Kessler
 Dan Turek as Bill
 Deane Clark as Raul Kessler
 Michael Hagedorn as Ted Jamison
 William McGough as Detective Dillon
 Andrew Carrillo as Cop
 Anna Markin as Tina Rotblatt
 David Gould as Stanley
 Tom Ciappa as Private Dick
 William Graham Cole as Swensen
 Helen Caro as Adele
 Kel Mitchell as Beave
 Jeff Kenny as Willie
 Sam Perry as Minister
 Hank Donat as Poet
 Nikki Lewis as Sandy
 Lou Wynhoff as Museum Guard
 Ted Lyde as Wayne
 Wendy Lucker as Reporter
 Tom Holycross as Cop #2
 Dan Callahan as Drag Queen
 M.J. Loheed as German Tourist
 Aja as Drag Queen #2
 Tom Phisella as Hick Man
 Rita Symons as Hick Woman
 Phyllis Diller as Painting Owner
 Lora Adams as Angry Art Patron

References

External links 

 

1997 films
1997 comedy films
1997 LGBT-related films
American LGBT-related films
American comedy films
1990s English-language films
1990s American films